The 2018 Australian Formula Ford Series was an Australian motor racing competition for Formula Ford and Formula Ford 1600 Racing Cars. The series, which was organised by the Formula Ford Association Inc, was the 49th Australian Formula Ford Series.

The Formula Ford (Duratec) class was won by Hunter McElrea driving a Mygale SJ10A and the Formula Ford 1600 (Kent) class by Dylan Fahey driving a Van Diemen.

References

Australian Formula Ford Series
Formula Ford Series